

Events

January
 2013 Aircel Chennai Open from 31 December 2012 to 6 January 2013. Janko Tipsarević was the singles champion and pair of Benoît Paire and Stanislas Wawrinka grabbed the doubles trophy.
 6 January : 3rd ODI against  was played in the Feroz Shah Kotla, New Delhi in which  won but lost the series 1-2.
 14 January: 2013 Hockey India League begin.
 20 January: 2012–13 World Series Hockey final.
 31 January: 2013 Women's Cricket World Cup begin in Mumbai.

February
 2013 Santosh Trophy begin.
 6 February – 10 February: 2013 Irani Cup at Wankhede Stadium, Mumbai. Rest of India retained the Irani cup by virtue of their first innings lead against Ranji Champions Mumbai.
 7 February - 10 February: 2013 Golf Premier League was scheduled. Uttarakhand Lions won the first title.
 14 February – 21 February: 2013 South Asian Games in Delhi.
 17 February: 2013 Women's Cricket World Cup finals.  won the world cup by beating  by 114 runs. 2013 Hockey India League finals. Ranchi Rhinos became the first Hockey India League Champions.
 18 February: 2012–13 Elite Football League of India season end.

March
 2013 Santosh Trophy end. Services won the Santosh Trophy 2013 after defeating Kerala in the 2013 final at Jawaharlal Nehru International Stadium, Kaloor, Kochi.

April
 3 April: 2013 Indian Premier League season begin.

May
 21 May: Pune Warriors India was suspended from the Indian Premier League due to the encasing of team's bank guarantee after Sahara failed to pay the entire franchise fees.
 26 May: 2013 Indian Premier League finals. Mumbai Indians won by beating Chennai Super Kings by 23 runs.
Host  finished fifth (after ) with 2 Gold, 1 Silver and 6 Bronze and total of 9 Medals.

August
 14 August - 31 August: 2013 Indian Badminton League is scheduled. Hyderabad Hotshots won the inaugural title, led by Saina Nehwal.

October
 27 October: 2013 Indian Grand Prix at Buddh International Circuit, Greater Noida.  Red Bull's Sebastian Vettel won it for the third time in a row.

November
 2 November - 10 November: 2013 Lusophony Games held in Goa. Postponed to be held during 18–29 January 2014
 6 November - 26 November: World Chess Championship 2013 to be held in Chennai. Magnus Carlsen won it with 6½–3½ after ten of the twelve scheduled games against Viswanathan Anand.
 17 November: 2013 Superbike World Championship season Indian Leg Buddh International Circuit, Greater Noida.

December
 1–14 December: 2013 Kabaddi World Cup in Bathinda, Punjab. India came out winners in both Men's and Women's championship.
 6–15 December: 2013 Men's Hockey Junior World Cup is to be held in India. Host city is New Delhi. India was placed at 10th rank.

Unknown
 2012–13 I-League end date.
 2013 I-League 2nd Division.
 2013 i1 super series.
 2013 Durand Cup
 2013–14 I-League begin date.
 2013 I-League U20.
 2013 Lusophony Games held in Margao, Goa.

Multi-sport Event

Sports Leagues in 2013

References